Sosa may refer to:

Name
Sosa (surname)
Alejandro "Alex" Sosa, fictional drug lord from the 1983 film Scarface
Chief Sosa (born 1995), American rapper Keith Farrelle Cozart, known as "Chief Keef"

Places
Sōsa, city in the Chiba prefecture, Japan
Sosa, Germany, a town in the district of Aue-Schwarzenberg in Saxony
Sosa, India, a village in Pithoragarh district, Uttarakhand, India
Sosa, Indonesia, a sub-district in Padang Lawas, North Sumatra, Indonesia
SoSA, Oklahoma City, an inner-city neighborhood in Oklahoma City

Other uses
Sosa Method or Sosa–Stradonitz Method, an ahnentafel system of numeration, named after Jerónimo de Sosa
Sosa station, a train station named after a district in Bucheon, South Korea
Sosa v. Alvarez-Machain, United States Supreme Court case
SOSA, initialism for State Opera of South Australia

See also

Sousa (disambiguation)